D. vulgaris may refer to:
 Dracunculus vulgaris, a plant species
 Desulfovibrio vulgaris, a bacterium species

See also
 Vulgaris (disambiguation)